Astrid-Lindgren-Preis was a German literary prize for children's literature. It was awarded from 1969 to 1999. 

Astrid Lindgren
German literary awards